Awtazavodskaya is a Minsk Metro station. It was opened on 7 November 1997.

Gallery

References 

Minsk Metro stations
Railway stations opened in 1997